Hugh J. Gallen (July 30, 1924 – December 29, 1982) was an American automobile dealer and Democratic politician from Littleton, New Hampshire. After serving in the New Hampshire House of Representatives, he served as the 74th governor of New Hampshire from 1979 until his death in 1982.

Gallen was born in Portland, Oregon.

Gallen served as governor from 1979 until his death. Although twice elected for two-year terms as governor he was defeated in his bid for a third term in 1982. In November 1982 he became seriously ill due to a blood infection that required dialysis. Gallen, who yielded his powers to State Senate President Vesta M. Roy, died a few days before the inauguration of his successor, John H. Sununu; Roy became acting governor during that time.

References

External links

|-

1924 births
1982 deaths
20th-century American businesspeople
20th-century American politicians
Businesspeople from Portland, Oregon
Democratic Party governors of New Hampshire
Democratic Party members of the New Hampshire House of Representatives
People from Littleton, New Hampshire